Below is a list of all the players to have played for the Coventry Blaze from 2000 to the present day.

 
England sport-related lists
Coventry-related lists